Bertram Leslie Richardson (3 January 1887 – 15 August 1962) was an Australian rules footballer who played for the St Kilda Football Club in the Victorian Football League (VFL).

Notes

External links 

1887 births
1962 deaths
Australian rules footballers from Victoria (Australia)
St Kilda Football Club players
Maryborough Football Club players